Purappadu is a 1990 Indian Malayalam language film,  directed by  Jeassy. The film stars Mammootty, Parvathy Jayaram, Sumalatha and Thikkurissy Sukumaran Nair in lead roles. The musical score to the film is by Ouseppachan and lyrics are written by the renowned lyricist O.N.V.Kurup. The film deals with social issues.

Cast

Mammootty as Viswanathan
Murali as Achu
Parvathy Jayaram as Mallika
Sumalatha as Nalini
Siddique as Basheer
Thikkurissy Sukumaran Nair as 
Kaviyoor Ponnamma
Aranmula Ponnamma as Elippennu
Philomina as 
Sai Kumar as Shivan
K. B. Ganesh Kumar as
Vijayaraghavan
Sithara as Kunjumol
Jose Prakash as
Balan K. Nair as Ravunni Nair
Adoor Bhavani
Babu Antony
M. S. Thripunithura as Thirumeni
V K Sreeraman as Hajiyar
Jagathy Sreekumar as Kunjuvarkey
Kanakalatha as Beevathu
Mohan Raj as Samuel
Innocent as Lonappan
Mamukkoya
Kollam Thulasi as District Collector

Production
The film was shot in Moolamattom in Kerala likes most Malayalam films, and was produced at MAC Productions. The film was shot by cinematographer Vipindas, and production design was by Kitho. The editing work for Purappadu was conducted by K. Sankunni.

Music
The musical score to the film is by Ouseppachan. The lyrics were written by O. N. V. Kurup, and the playback singers were Ambili, K. J. Yesudas, K.S. Chitra, M. G. Sreekumar, and P. B. Sreenivas. The background music to the film was composed by Shyam. The film features the songs "Annaloonjal" ( a raga), "Doore Doore", "Ee mannu nammude mannu" and "Manjupeyyunna!". The song "Doore Doore" is written by O.N.V. Kurup and is sung by P. B. Sreenivas and K. S. Chithra.

Songs

References

External links
 
Purappadu at the Malayalam Movie and Music Encyclopedia
"Annaloonjal" at Inbaminge.com

Films directed by Jeassy
1990 films
Films shot in Munnar
Films scored by Ouseppachan
1990s Malayalam-language films